The history of the Jews in Hadramaut stretches back to ancient times. The Hadhrami Jews were a subset of the Yemeni Jews.

History

The community was very old, and, after the rise of Islam and the expulsion of the Hejazi Jews, the main centers of Jewish population in Arabia were in Hadhramaut and in Aden. However, the Jews of Hadhramaut were much more isolated than their counterparts in Aden, and the community only became known to the outside world in the 1940s. The community had distinctive religious traditions. Many of the Hadhrami Jews converted to Islam, but after the founding of the State of Israel, some of the community made Aliyah, but those who remained assimilated and converted to Islam. Today, there are no longer any Hadhramaut Jews known to exist in Yemen.

Geography and families

The Jews of Hadhramaut lived in Seiyun, Tarim, Mukalla and Al-Sheher. Among the well known Jewish families of the region in Al-Sheher and Mukalla are Ben Haneen, Ben Haiem, Ben Yaze'a, Ben Ysra'ail and Ben Qatian Ben Zeghieo. Most of these families converted to Islam in the time period from 1509 until the 1960s and a few migrated to Israel after 1948. After the union between south and north and because of the strict tribal system most of these families melted in the tribal community by renaming their family name after a well-known tribe to avoid discrimination based on their former Jewish roots. The Ben Qattian family in Hadhramaut are dagger-makers and gold-smiths. Their handmade daggers are well known.

See also
Yemenite Jews
Jews of Aden
Hadhrami people
Habbani Jews

References

http://www.eretzyisroel.org/~jkatz/arabia.html
New Standard Jewish Encyclopedia, 1992, Encyclopedia Publishing, "Arabia", "Hadramaut"

Yemenite Jews
Jewish Yemeni history
Jews
Jews